This is a list of shopping malls in Moscow and Moscow Oblast in Russia.

Malls in Moscow

As of January 2013, Moscow had 82 malls, including two of the largest in Europe. In 2016, data from the FourSquare social network shows that Moscow has at least 100 shopping malls. Another source lists over 280 malls.
MEGA malls are series of malls located all around Russia. There are currently three MEGA malls in Moscow, with all of the being located in Moscow Oblast.

Gallery

References

External links
 Leading brands in Moscow malls

Shopping malls in Russia
Russia
Shopping malls
Shopping malls